Those Were the Days... is a 2000 Hong Kong film directed by Raymond Yip. The film is a spin-off/prequel of the Young and Dangerous film series, as it follows the life of Chicken Chiu (Jordan Chan) before he joined the triads with the boss Chan Ho Nam (Ekin Cheng), Chou-pan (Jason Chu) and Cheung May Yun (Kristy Yang).

Cast
 Jordan Chan – Chicken Chiu Shan-Ho
 Gigi Leung – Lok Wing-Gee
 Michael Tse – Dai Tin-Yee
 Jerry Lamb – Pou-pan
 Jason Chu – Chou-pan
 Ekin Cheng – Chan Ho-Nam
 Kristy Yang – Cheung May Yun
 Anthony Wong – Tai Fei
 Vincent Wan – Ben Hon
 Sandra Ng – Sister 13
 Lee Siu-kei – Kei
 Bill Chan	
 Ng Chi Hung – Uncle Bee (uncredited)

See also
 List of Hong Kong films

External links

2000 films
Triad films
2000s Cantonese-language films
Films directed by Raymond Yip
Young and Dangerous
2000s Hong Kong films